"Reach Out" is a 1984 song by Giorgio Moroder, which was the official theme song of the 1984 Summer Olympics held in Los Angeles, United States  and sung by Paul Engemann. It was later included on Moroder's 1985 album Innovisions.

Background
The song is an encouragement for the athletes to win.

Music video 
The music video does not contain any treatment and is made up of cut scenes with athletes. In the scenes the athletes swim, run a marathon and long jump and in between it, a medal is shown.

Track listing 
7" single
 "Reach Out" — 3:43
 "Reach Out" (Instrumental) — 2:51

12" single
 "Reach Out" — 3:43
 "Reach Out" (Instrumental) — 2:51

Charts

Cover versions 
1984: Ricky Shayne
1999: Karel Gott
2003: Lichtenfels

References 

1984 songs
1984 singles
Number-one singles in Germany
Giorgio Moroder songs
Paul Engemann songs
Olympic theme songs
Summer Olympic official songs and anthems
Songs written by Giorgio Moroder
Song recordings produced by Giorgio Moroder
Hansa Records singles